Brian Ryan (born 1998) is an Irish hurler who plays for Limerick Senior Championship club South Liberties and at inter-county level with the Limerick senior hurling team. He usually lines out as a left wing-forward.

Career statistics

Honours

Ardscoil Rís
Dr. Harty Cup (1): 2016

Limerick
All-Ireland Senior Hurling Championship (1): 2020
Munster Senior Hurling Championship (1): 2020
National Hurling League (1): 2020

References

1998 births
Living people
South Liberties hurlers
Limerick inter-county hurlers